Jelogir (also Romanized as Pa Alam, Jelow Gīr, Jalogīr, Jelo Gīr, Jelūgīr, and Jolow Gīr) is a village in Pa Alam, in the Central District of Pol-e Dokhtar County, Lorestan Province, Iran. At the 2006 census, its population was 535, in 115 families.

References 

Towns and villages in Pol-e Dokhtar County